English singer-songwriter Fleur East has released two studio albums, one extended play and eight studio singles. Fleur signed a record deal with Syco in 2014 and released her debut album Love, Sax and Flashbacks in 2015. It charted at 14 in the UK Albums Chart and has been certified Silver by the British Phonographic Industry. The album spawned two singles, European chart hit "Sax", which was certified Platinum in the UK and charted at number 3, and "More and More". 

She released her second studio album Fearless under her own label Platinum East in March 2020. The album's lead single "Favourite Thing" charted at number 80 in the UK, and the song "Size" was used in a Debenhams Christmas ad campaign in 2019. The album is scheduled to be supported by East's first headline tour The Fearless Experience.

Albums

Extended plays

Singles

As lead artist

As featured artist

Other charted songs

Guest appearances

Music videos

Notes

References

Discographies of British artists
Rhythm and blues discographies